The Ministry of Labour and Human Resources is a ministry of Bhutan responsible to facilitate human resource development for economic development and to ensure gainful employment for the Bhutanese workforce.

Departments 
The Ministry of Labour and Human Resources is responsible for: 
Department of Employment  
Department of Human Resources  
Department of Labour  
Department of Occupational Standards

Minister 
 Ugyen Tshering (2007-2008)
 Dorji Wangdi (2008-2013)
 Ngeema Sangay Tshempo (2013-2018)
 Ugyen Dorji (7 November 2018 - ...)

References

Labour and Human Resources
Bhutan
Labour in Bhutan
Demographics of Bhutan